Ken Boshcoff (born June 20, 1949) was mayor of Thunder Bay, Ontario from 1997 to 2003 and a Canadian Member of Parliament for Thunder Bay—Rainy River from 2004 to 2008. He was elected Mayor of Thunder Bay again, on October 24, 2022.

Early life

Boshcoff was born in Fort William and was raised in Westfort by parents of Ukrainian/Polish and Bulgarian descent. He attended Crawford, St. Ann, St Patrick, and Westgate schools. Boshcoff then studied at Lakehead University as an undergraduate, then proceeded to graduate studies at York University.

Career
As a teenager he began an office-cleaning company and then worked a series of part-time jobs until completing his degrees.
He was obtained work in the Provincial and National Parks systems to pay for his tuition and developed his environmental skills in Quetico, Pukaskwa, Gros Morne, Terra Nova, and the St Lawrence Islands.

He later worked for the Federal Government as the District Planner for Indian and Northern Affairs. After that he joined the family insurance business until moving to the Thunder Bay Port Authority as their Director of Marketing. With his brother he formed a new company "Boshcoff & Associates" until becoming Mayor.

After six years as Mayor, Boshcoff became the Member of Parliament for Thunder Bay—Rainy River until 2008.

He returned to the business world as a consultant in Business Development and Government Navigation.

He has worked as a mediator and provided advice on governance as well as finding solutions for both not-for-profit organizations and businesses. He returned to Council in 2010, and became known for his advocacy for the community.

Boshcoff ran for mayor in Thunder Bay's 2014 municipal election. He was the runner up, losing to the incumbent Keith Hobbs.

Electoral Record

Municipal

Federal

	

				

|}

|}

References

External links
 
 How'd They Vote?: Ken Boshcoff's voting history and quotes
 Lakehead Rotarians 'Presidents Edition' Club Chronicle

1949 births
Liberal Party of Canada MPs
Living people
Canadian people of Bulgarian descent
Canadian people of Ukrainian descent
Mayors of Thunder Bay
Members of the House of Commons of Canada from Ontario
York University alumni
Thunder Bay city councillors
Lakehead University alumni
21st-century Canadian politicians